eFluor nanocrystals are a class of fluorophores made of semiconductor quantum dots. The nanocrystals can be provided as either primary amine, carboxylate, or non-functional groups on the surface, allowing conjugation to biomolecules of a researcher's choice. The nanocrystals can be conjugated to primary antibodies which are used for flow cytometry, immunohistochemistry, microarrays, in vivo imaging and microscopy.

Size
The optical emission properties of eFluor Nanocrystals are primarily dictated by their size, as discussed in the next section.  There are at least two aspects to consider when discussing the "size" of a quantum dot: the physical size of the semiconductor structure, and the size of the entire quantum dot moiety including the associated ligands and hydrophilic coating.  The size of the semiconductor structure is tabulated below, and reflects the diameter of the spherical quantum dot without ligands.  eFluor Nanocrystals are rendered water-dispersable with a patented poly-ethylene glycol (PEG) lipid layer that functions as both a protective hydrophilic coating around the quantum dot, as well as reducing non-specific binding  By dynamic light scattering measurements, the hydrodynamic radius of all eFluor Nanocrystals ranges from 10 to 13nm.

Properties and structure 
Quantum dots are unique fluorophores relative to organic dyes, like fluorescein or rhodamine because they are composed of semiconductor metals, instead of a π-conjugated carbon-bonding framework.  With organic dyes, the length of the π-conjugated framework (quantum confinement), as well as side-groups (electron donating/withdrawing or halogens) tend to dictate the absorption and emission spectra of the molecule.  Semiconductor quantum dots also work on the concept of quantum confinement, (often referred to as "Particle in a Box" theory) where an exciton is formed inside the crystal lattice by an incident photon of higher energy.  The electron and hole of the exciton have an interaction energy that is tuned by changing the physical size of the quantum dot.  The absorption and emission colors are tuned such that smaller quantum dots confine the exciton into a tighter physical space and increase the energy.  Alternatively, a larger quantum dot confines the exciton into a larger physical space, lowering the interaction energy of the electron and hole, and decreasing the energy of the system.  As shown in the table above, the diameter of the CdSe quantum dots is related to the emission energy such that the smaller quantum dots emit photons toward the blue wavelength range (higher energy) and the larger quantum dots emit photons toward the red wavelength range (lower energy.)

To the right are representative absorption (blue) and emission (red) spectra for the eFluor-605 nanocrystal. The absorption spectrum of nanocrystals displays a number of peaks overlaid on background that rises exponentially toward the ultraviolet, where the lowest energy absorption peak arises from the 1S-1S transition, and has been correlated to the physical size of the quantum dot. Generally referred to as the "1st exciton," and is the primary absorption characteristic used to determine both size and concentration for most quantum dots.

The photoluminescence spectra of quantum dots are also unique relative to organic dyes in that they are typically Gaussian-shaped curves with no red-tailing to the spectrum.  The width of the photoluminescence peak represents the heterogeneity in size dispersion of the quantum dots, where a large size dispersion will lead to broad emission peaks, and tight size-dispersion will lead to narrow emission peaks, often quantified by the full width at half maximum (FWHM) value.  eFluor Nanocrystals are specified at ≤30nm FWHM for the CdSe nanocrystals, and ≤70nm FWHM for the InGaP eFluor 700 nanocrystals.

References

Luminescence